Fossil Ridge High School is the newest of four public high schools in Fort Collins, Colorado, United States. The school opened in August 2004, and was intended to help better distribute students in Fort Collins and alleviate pressure on Rocky Mountain High School.

History
Voters approved the opening of Fossil Ridge High School in 2000, and the school first opened to students in August 2004 with 475 students in grades 10 and 11.

Athletics
Fossil Ridge High School participates in the 5A Front Range League and offers all major sports to students.

Swimming
The boys' swim team won state championships in 2015, 2016 and 2017 while head coach Mark Morehouse was awarded National High School Coach of the Year honors by the National High School Coaches Association following the 2016 championship win. The girls' swim team won state championships in 2011-12, 2014–15, and again in 2016-17.

Cheerleading
The cheerleading program consists of three teams, two of which are competitive. There is a freshman team, a junior varsity team and a varsity team. The junior varsity team won CSCA State in 2017 in All-Girl and in 2018 as Co-ed. The varsity team won the Front Range League competition for the fifth consecutive year holding the title from 2014 to 2018.

Hockey
The boys' hockey team won their state championships during the 2011-12 season. Even though they are known as the "lambkins", another high school mascot located in Colorado, the team plays for the whole Poudre School District.

Unified sports
Fossil Ridge High School has a unified sports program, which pairs students with and without disabilities together on teams. The Colorado Special Olympics named Fossil Ridge the 2015 Project Unify School of the Year for their work to create an inclusive environment through unified sports.

Fossil Ridge was the first high school in Fort Collins to begin a unified basketball team, an activity that has since spread to every other comprehensive high school. They again set a precedent in 2014 by launching a unified flag football tournament, which led to unified flag football teams being created at all the main city high schools in the fall of 2015.

Activities

Band
The marching band at Fossil Ridge won the state championships in 2012, 2013, 2018, and 2019. and took second place in 2014, 2015, 2016, and 2017.

Knowledge Bowl
Fossil Ridge's Knowledge Bowl team won the Colorado state title in 2012 and 2013. The team took second place in the state in the interscholastic academic competition in 2014, and claimed the state title again in 2015 and 2016.

Newspaper
The school's monthly newspaper, Etched In Stone, won the Colorado High School Press Association's 2012 Best In Show: Website Award, as well as the National Scholastic Press Association's Pacemaker Finalist Award (the highest honor in scholastic journalism).

Theater
The school's Improv team ranked first in the state in the International Thespian Society's state conferences in 2015 and 2016.

Sabercat Studios
The head of the film program at Fossil Ridge High School is teacher Brendan Gallagher. Projects include the triennial Lip dubs, the 2013 Ridge Life Movie, and the 2014 Moment in Time project.

Students in Ridge TV learn editing and sound production software, professional production skills, and develop segments for a weekly school-wide broadcast. Students create, over the course of the year, short films in the SaberCats Studios that are premiered in the annual FOASS (Films on a Shoe String) film festival. Students then move on to compete in the Fort Collins High School Film Festival, viewed by the general public at the Lyric Theater in Fort Collins.

School design
Fossil Ridge High School was the first Leadership in Energy and Environmental Design (LEED) high school in Colorado. The building was constructed out of environmentally friendly materials and has double-pane windows and solar panels. The school also has energy-efficient lighting, heating and cooling systems, and sustainable landscape design.

As a result of its design, Fossil Ridge's energy savings are about 60 percent. The school saves approximately $100,000 a year in utilities. The Discovery Channel hosted a special highlighting energy saving at the school and its importance in modern society.

Notable alumni
 Kelley Johnson (class of 2010), Miss Colorado 2015
 Sophia Smith (class of 2018), soccer player for the Portland Thorns and first pick in the 2020 NWSL College Draft.
 Jaelin Howell (class of 2018), soccer player for the USWNT and Florida State University.
 Codi Heuer (class of 2015), MLB pitcher for the Chicago Cubs

References

Public high schools in Colorado
Education in Fort Collins, Colorado
Schools in Larimer County, Colorado